The 2020 Ag-Pro 300 was a NASCAR Xfinity Series race held on October 3, 2020. It was contested over 113 laps on the  tri-oval superspeedway. It was the twenty-eighth race of the 2020 NASCAR Xfinity Series season, the second race of the playoffs, and the second race in the Round of 12. Kaulig Racing driver Justin Haley collected his third win of the season.

Report

Background 
Talladega Superspeedway, originally known as Alabama International Motor Superspeedway (AIMS), is a motorsports complex located north of Talladega, Alabama. It is located on the former Anniston Air Force Base in the small city of Lincoln. The track is a tri-oval and was constructed in the 1960s by the International Speedway Corporation, a business controlled by the France family. Talladega is most known for its steep banking and the unique location of the start/finish line that's located just past the exit to pit road. The track currently hosts the NASCAR series such as the NASCAR Cup Series, Xfinity Series and the Camping World Truck Series. Talladega is the longest NASCAR oval with a length of  tri-oval like the Daytona International Speedway, which also is a  tri-oval.

The race was added to the schedule because of pandemic related cancellations, and spectators were restricted to campers in lots assigned by the speedway. No grandstands were open.

Entry list 

 (R) denotes rookie driver.
 (i) denotes driver who is ineligible for series driver points.

Qualifying 
Chase Briscoe was awarded the pole based on competition based formula.

Qualifying results

Race

Race results

Stage Results 
Stage One
Laps: 25

Stage Two
Laps: 25

Final Stage Results 

Laps: 63

Race statistics 

 Lead changes: 13 among 9 different drivers
 Cautions/Laps: 7 for 25
 Time of race: 2 hours, 8 minutes, and 24 seconds
 Average speed:

References 

NASCAR races at Talladega Superspeedway
2020 in sports in Alabama
Ag-Pro 300
2020 NASCAR Xfinity Series